Jacob Gregersen (born 12 October 1972 in Denmark) is a Danish retired footballer.

References

Danish men's footballers
Living people
Association football defenders
1972 births
FC Groningen players
Herfølge Boldklub players
FC Nordsjælland players
Odense Boldklub players
SønderjyskE Fodbold players